The 1997 Westar Rules season was the 113th season of senior football in Perth, Western Australia. It featured a number of dramatic changes to a competition whose popularity had been dramatically reduced by the drain of players to the Eagles and Dockers of the AFL. The competition's name was changed from the prosaic ‘West Australian Football League’ to ‘Westar Rules’ in an attempt to update the local competition for a more sophisticated audience. However, this change became regarded as unsuccessful and was reversed as per recommendations of the “Fong Report” after four seasons. West Perth also changed their name to Joondalup to recognise their location in Perth's growing northwestern suburbs, but changed back after the ninth round.

More significantly, after intense debate for a number of years about whether to expand or contract the competition, a new team, was added, despite requests from Peel's licence holders that they not be required to enter before 1998. This was the first change to the number of teams in the WA(N)FL for sixty-three years.

In their first eighteen seasons, Peel won only seventy-three matches out of 354 (a winning percentage of 20.6%) and never had a winning season, finishing with nine wooden spoons. Along with occasional serious financial difficulties, this produced serious criticism of the decision in subsequent years, but Peel qualified for the finals for the first time in 2015, and won the premiership the following year. A proposal to limit Westar to players under 25 and a few older veterans in order to allow a better flow of players to the AFL was made during the season but rejected.

Affected badly by the erratic availability of a number of AFL-listed players, reigning premiers Claremont had their worst season since 1975 and equalled East Fremantle's decline in 1980 from premiers to only five wins, whilst Swan Districts, brilliant but erratic during 1996, began with nine wins in their first ten matches before losing eight of their next nine to miss the finals for the third successive season.

On a more positive side, the season saw  win its first premiership in seventeen years in a thrilling comeback Grand Final win over traditional rivals East Fremantle, and  have (after a disastrous opening) its only winning season since 1988, and culminating in its last finals appearance until 2020.

Home-and-away season

Round 1 (Easter weekend)

Round 2

Round 3

Round 4

Round 5 (Anzac Day)

Round 6

Round 7

Round 8

Round 9

Round 10 (Foundation Day)

Round 11

Round 12

Round 13

Round 14

Round 15

Round 16

Round 17

Round 18

Round 19

Round 20

Round 21

Round 22

Round 23

Ladder

Finals series

Semi-finals

Preliminary final

Grand Final

References

External links
Official WAFL website
Westar Rules Season 1997

West Australian Football League seasons
Westar Rules